Emilio Ulloa Valenzuela (born October 22, 1954) is a retired male steeplechase runner from Chile.

Career
He represented his native country in the 1984 and 1988 Summer Olympics.

Achievements

References

 
 Full Olympians
 1983 Year Ranking
 

1954 births
Living people
Chilean male long-distance runners
Athletes (track and field) at the 1983 Pan American Games
Athletes (track and field) at the 1987 Pan American Games
Athletes (track and field) at the 1984 Summer Olympics
Athletes (track and field) at the 1988 Summer Olympics
Olympic athletes of Chile
Pan American Games gold medalists for Chile
Pan American Games medalists in athletics (track and field)
Place of birth missing (living people)
Chilean male steeplechase runners
Chilean male middle-distance runners
South American Games gold medalists for Chile
South American Games silver medalists for Chile
South American Games medalists in athletics
Competitors at the 1982 Southern Cross Games
Competitors at the 1986 South American Games
Medalists at the 1983 Pan American Games
20th-century Chilean people